Christopher Parsons Wolcott was a Republican politician from the state of Ohio. He was Ohio Attorney General  1856–1860 and United States Assistant Secretary of War from 1862 to 1863.

Biography
Wolcott was born December 17, 1820, in Wolcott, Connecticut. In 1833 he was moved to Steubenville, Ohio, and attended public schools.  He attended Washington College in Pennsylvania, where he graduated in 1840. He read law with Tappan & Stanton in Steubenville, and was admitted to the bar and began practice in Ravenna, Ohio. In Ravenna he partnered with Lucius V. Bierce. In 1846 he moved to Akron, Ohio. In Akron he partnered with William Otis, until Otis removed to Cleveland. He then partnered with William H. Upson, which lasted the rest of his life. In 1856, Governor Salmon P. Chase appointed him Ohio Attorney General to replace the deceased Francis D. Kimball. He was elected to a two-year term later in 1856, and another in 1858.

His cases as attorney general included the Breslin Treasury defalcation and the Wellington Rescue, where his arguments before the United States Supreme Court were widely celebrated.

Ohio Governor William Dennison named Wolcott to replace the deceased John C. Wright at the Peace Conference of 1861.

In May, 1862, Secretary of War, fellow Steubenville native and Wolcott's brother in law, Edwin M. Stanton asked him to be First Assistant Secretary during the American Civil War.

Stanton was prophetic, as under the strain of the job, Wolcott's health gave out, leading to his resignation February, 1863. He returned to Akron. After two months of suffering, he died there April 4, 1863.

Notes

References

People from Jefferson County, Ohio
Washington & Jefferson College alumni
1820 births
Politicians from Akron, Ohio
People from Ravenna, Ohio
Ohio Attorneys General
Ohio Republicans
Ohio lawyers
1863 deaths
People of Ohio in the American Civil War
United States Assistant Secretaries of War
19th-century American politicians
19th-century American lawyers